Banwari Lal Hansaria (25 December 1931 ― 3 November 1997) was an Indian Judge and former judge of the Supreme Court of India.

Career
Hansaria completed his schooling in Sardarshahar and studied at Birla Arts College, Pilani. He passed M.A. from the Calcutta University and M.Sc. from the London School of Economics. After passing LL.B., he started practice and was engaged in JB Law College of Guwahati as a lecturer. Hansaria was appointed District and Sessions Judge in 1971. From 15 July 1976 to 9 February 1979, he served as the Legal Remembrancer and Judicial Department Secretary to the Government of Assam. In 1979, Hansaria was elevated as Judge of Gauhati High Court. He became the Chief Justice of Orissa High Court on 22 February 1990. Justice Hansaria was appointed Judge of the Supreme Court of India on 14 December 1993 and retired from  the service in 1996. He is the author of number of law books and articles.

References

1931 births
1997 deaths
Indian judges
20th-century Indian judges
21st-century Indian judges
Justices of the Supreme Court of India
Chief Justices of the Orissa High Court
Judges of the Gauhati High Court
University of Calcutta alumni
Alumni of the London School of Economics